"I Am the Future" is a 1982 song by rock musician Alice Cooper. The song was one of two singles released from his 1982 album Zipper Catches Skin. The single did not chart, and despite the advent of MTV at the time a promotional video was not created for it.

The song was produced by Steve Tyrell and written by Gary Osborne and Lalo Schifrin. It was featured as the theme song to the 1982 Canadian film Class of 1984, released to cinemas at around the same time.

The 1982 US single featured the album version of the song and "Tag, You're It" as its B-side. The international single version, released in March 1983 in most countries, featured a remix of the song, and had "Zorro's Ascent" as its B-side. Like "I Am the Future", both B-sides are also featured on the Zipper Catches Skin album. The remix version of "I Am the Future" was eventually included in 1999's The Life and Crimes of Alice Cooper box set.

Releases on albums
 Zipper Catches Skin - album version
 The Life and Crimes of Alice Cooper - remix version

References

1983 singles
Songs with lyrics by Gary Osborne
Alice Cooper songs
Warner Records singles
1982 songs
American new wave songs
American pop rock songs